Ángel Reyes (February 14, 1919 – November 17, 1988), originally from Cuba, was an American violinist.

He was conductor of the Thirteenth Sound Group of Havana, music director of the Cuban Military Police Band and a composer of Cuban traditional instrumental and vocal works. Camejo recorded Julián Carrillo's Preludio a Colón (Prelude to Christopher Columbus) on the Columbia Records label.

As a concert soloist, he appeared with the Philadelphia Orchestra and New York Philharmonic throughout the United States, Europe, Canada and Latin America.

A Professor of Music at the University of Michigan and Northwestern University, he performed with the Northwestern Piano Trio (formed in 1959) with pianist Gui Mombaerts and cellist Dudley Powers.

He was married to Jill Bailiff, former harpist with the Philadelphia Orchestra and Professor of harp at Northwestern University and Eastern Michigan University.

At one time he owned the famous Lipinski Stradivarius violin, on which he played Glazunov's Violin Concerto in November 1942 with the Havana Philharmonic Orchestra conducted by Massimo Freccia, as well as with the Philadelphia Orchestra conducted by Eugene Ormandy. He also owned a violin by Carlo Bergonzi, known as the "Kreisler Bergonzi", previously owned by Fritz Kreisler and later by Itzhak Perlman.

Ángel Reyes presented many master classes and adjudicated string and chamber music competitions in the U.S., Canada and France.  From 1968-1983 he spent summers on the faculty of the University Division of the National Music Camp at Interlochen.  Retiring as Professor Emeritus from the University of Michigan School of Music in June 1985, Reyes then established residency in Sarasota, Florida.

Ángel Reyes was survived by his wife Jill Bailiff, his son David, his daughter Lisa, and three grandsons Braiden, Ángelo, and Ivan.

References

Cuban violinists
Male violinists
1919 births
1988 deaths
University of Michigan faculty
Northwestern University faculty
20th-century violinists
20th-century male musicians
Cuban emigrants to the United States